The Shire of Metcalfe was a local government area about  north-northwest of Melbourne, the state capital of Victoria, Australia, and  south of the regional city of Bendigo.

History

Metcalfe was incorporated as a road district on 14 August 1860, and became a shire on 18 July 1865.

On 20 January 1995, the Shire of Metcalfe was abolished, and along with the City of Castlemaine and the Shires of Maldon and Newstead, was merged into the newly created Shire of Mount Alexander. The town of Redesdale and the area surrounding Lake Eppalock were transferred into the City of Greater Bendigo.

Wards

The Shire of Metcalfe was divided into four ridings, each of which elected three councillors:
 Chewton Riding
 Harcourt Riding
 Taradale Riding
 East Riding

Towns and localities
 Barfold
 Barkers Creek
 Chewton
 Elphinstone
 Faraday
 Golden Point
 Harcourt
 Harcourt North
 Langley
 Metcalfe*
 Myrtle Creek
 Redesdale
 Sutton Grange
 Taradale

* Council seat.

Population

* Estimate in the 1958 Victorian Year Book.

Gallery

References

External links
 Victorian Places - Metcalfe Shire

Metcalfe
1860 establishments in Australia